Sidney Swift is an American entrepreneur, inventor, and  Grammy award nominated producer. He is the founder and CEO of entertainment technology company Defient and leads Rolling Stone Magazine's web3 culture council.

Swift started his career in 2010 as a songwriter and since has written and/or produced songs performed by Nicki Minaj, Panic! At The Disco, Lil Wayne, Beyoncé, Big Sean, Future, Nelly, and more. He contributed to Billboard hits such as Beyoncé's "7/11", Jason Derulo's "Don't Wanna Go Home”, Gucci Mane's “Make Love”, Nicki Minaj's “Changed It”, DJ Khaled's  “Welcome to My Hood” and Major Lazer's "Light It Up".

In 2017, in partnership with Atlantic Records, Swift developed the avatar artist known as Chillpill. The project was an early example of what is now known as metaverse performances. Chillpill has released songs with Rico Nasty, Sueco, BBNO$ and was nominated for a 2018 Grammy award.

In 2020 Swift founded Defient, an entertainment technology company specializing creator tools, music video games, motion capture live streaming shows, audio plug-ins, NFT collections, and mobile metaverse ownership, customization, and accessibility. In 2021 he was granted a US Patent for inventing a synchronized streaming technology used in music and television to deliver a second layer content experience on top of traditional media.

Selected discography

Awards and nominations 

Grammy Awards

|-
|rowspan="2"|2019
|War & Leisure (as producer)
|Best Urban Contemporary Album
|
|-
|The Kids Are Alright (as writer)
|Best Urban Contemporary Album
|

References

External links
 

1988 births
Living people
Record producers from Florida
Songwriters from Florida
Musicians from Miami